Samuel Hopkins or Sam Hopkins may refer to:

Samuel Hopkins (inventor) (1743–1818), American inventor who was awarded the first US patent for a process to refine potash
Samuel Hopkins (theologian) (1721–1803), American clergyman who formulated a religious system called Hopkinsism or Hopkinsianism
Samuel Hopkins (congressman) (1753–1819), United States Congressman from Kentucky
Samuel I. Hopkins (1843–1914), U.S. Representative from Virginia
Samuel M. Hopkins (1772–1837), United States Representative from New York
Sam Hopkins (rugby league) (born 1990), English rugby league footballer
Lightnin' Hopkins (Sam John Hopkins, 1912–1982), American blues guitarist
Sam Hopkins (artist) (born 1979), Artist whose work is rooted in Kenya

See also
Samuel Hopkins House, a historic home in Suffolk County, New York